Dean is an unincorporated community in Monterey County, California.

References

Unincorporated communities in Monterey County, California
Salinas Valley
Unincorporated communities in California